Erik Öberg (9 March 1889 – 19 March 1924) was a Swedish wrestler. He competed in the featherweight event at the 1912 Summer Olympics.

References

External links
 

1889 births
1924 deaths
Olympic wrestlers of Sweden
Wrestlers at the 1912 Summer Olympics
Swedish male sport wrestlers
People from Varberg
Sportspeople from Halland County